Beggars Tick Wildlife Refuge, also known as Beggars Tick Marsh, is a  park in Portland, Oregon's Lents neighborhood, in the United States.

References

External links

 

Lents, Portland, Oregon
Parks in Portland, Oregon